This is a list of cricket grounds in Burma (also known as Myanmar).  Cricket in Burma dates back to when Burma was a province of British India.  The British brought the game there, as they did to the rest of India, and the game progressed to the level where the Marylebone Cricket Club played two two-day first class matches there on a tour to India in 1926/27, although as with most colonial teams of the day, the Burmese teams were composed of British officials.  The grounds included in this list are reflective of those two matches, having held a first-class match, representing the only time first-class matches have been played in Burma.

References

External links
Cricket grounds in Burma at CricketArchive

Cricket in Myanmar
Cricket grounds
Burma
Cricket grounds